Gilbert Rey (born 30 October 1930) is a Swiss football forward who played for Switzerland in the 1962 FIFA World Cup. He also played for FC Lausanne-Sport.

References

External links
FIFA profile

1930 births
Swiss men's footballers
Switzerland international footballers
Association football forwards
FC Lausanne-Sport players
1962 FIFA World Cup players
Living people